Peter Zupanc (born January 8, 1982 in Ljubljana) is a retired Slovenian javelin thrower. He represented Slovenia at the 2004 Summer Olympics, and also recorded his own personal best of 78.60 metres from the Slovenian Championships in his native Ljubljana. Throughout his sporting career, Zupanc trained for Kronos Athletics Association.

Zupanc qualified for the Slovenian squad in the men's javelin throw at the 2004 Summer Olympics in Athens, by registering a B-standard entry mark of 78.60 metres from the Slovenian Championships. Zupanc released a javelin with a satisfying 77.34-metre throw on his third attempt in the qualifying round, nearly an inch shorter of his personal best. Placing twenty-second out of thirty-four athletes in the overall standings, Zupanc failed to advance further to the final.

References

External links

1982 births
Living people
Slovenian male javelin throwers
Olympic athletes of Slovenia
Athletes (track and field) at the 2004 Summer Olympics
Sportspeople from Ljubljana